L'Impartial (literally "The Impartial") is a Swiss French language daily newspaper published by Société Neuchâteloise de Presse SA in La Chaux-de-Fonds, Canton of Neuchâtel.

Published since 1880, it is a sister newspaper to L'Express (English: The Express).

See also
 List of newspapers in Switzerland

External links
 limpartial.ch (in Swiss French), the newspaper's official website
 L'Impartial archive  (in Swiss French)

1880 establishments in Switzerland
Daily newspapers published in Switzerland
French-language newspapers published in Switzerland
Newspapers established in 1880
La Chaux-de-Fonds